In Freemasonry, the chamber of reflection (also called, the room of reflection, reflection cabinet or meditation cabinet) is the place where part of the initiation process takes place. It is used as a test of isolation during which the recipient is invited to perform some introspection. This is facilitated by the presence of symbolic objects and evocative sentences which may differ slightly depending on the rites. This phase of isolation generally begins the initiation ritual that a layman experiences when he enters a Masonic course.

Origins

Isolation is an age-old practice in initiation rituals. For example, Manding tribes send the young recipient into seclusion in the forest to confront the kankurang. The reflective practice is seen by some historians as a legacy of alchemical traditions and esoteric treatises. The claim is further supported by the fact that the kankurang is the only place where the young person can learn the art of initiation. The assertion is further based on the stripping of the metals offered to the candidate mason and pertaining to alchemical transmutation but also on the three hermetic principles arranged in the place: salt, sulfur and mercury. The influence would have given birth, in 1750, to the "Rituel alchimique secret du grade de vrai franc-maçon académicien" in English "Secret alchemical ritual of the grade of true Freemason academician" created by Antoine-Joseph Pernety founder of the lodge Illuminés of Avignon. This ritual included all the evocations now present in the reflection room. Finally, the meditation room has been considered by some authors and psychoanalysts as the modern form of the ancient initiatory hut or cavern.

In terms of symbolic origins, the French writer and philosopher Daniel Béresniak draws a parallel between the mythological Cretan labyrinth of the Minotaur built by Daedalus and the meditation room. The writer Oswald Wirth played a significant role in the understanding of Masonic symbolism and perpetuated, through several works, the idea of an alchemical origin.

Description 

Well known American Freemason, Albert G. Mackey in his 1873 book "Mackey's Encyclopedia of Freemasonry" describes the Chamber of Reflection as; "..a small room adjoining the Lodge, in which, preparatory to initiation, the candidate is enclosed for the purpose of indulging in those serious meditations which its sombre appearance and the gloomy emblems with which it is furnished are calculated to produce. It is also used in some of the advanced degrees for a similar purpose."

In the 1860, "Rituel de l'Apprenti Maçon" from French Freemason Jean-Marie Ragon, the Chamber of reflection is thus described; "... It is a dark place impenetrable to the rays of the day and lit by a sepulchral lamp. The walls are painted black with funerary emblems in order to bring to meditation the recipient who will have to go through the four elements of the ancients and undergo his first ordeal, that of the EARTH in which he is supposed to be to remind him of his last resting place. In the form of the skeleton that lies next to him in an open coffin symbolizing the nothingness of human vanities. If there were no skeleton, a skull and crossbones would be placed on the table. The furnishings of this room consist of a chair and a table covered with a white carpet on which are paper, ink, powder, pen and lamp. Above the table are represented a Rooster and an Hourglass, and underneath these two words, VIGILANCE (on one's actions) PERSEVERANCE (in good), the hours being counted. The inscriptions, usually placed on the walls, are these: "If curiosity leads you here, go away; if you fear to be enlightened about your faults, you will be badly off among us. If you are capable of concealment, tremble, we will penetrate you! If you are fond of human distinctions, go out, they are not known here. If your soul has felt the fear, don't go further. If you persevere you will be purified by the elements, you will come out of the abyss of darkness, you will see the light.  After the patient has had time to examine and reflect, he is given a paper with three questions to answer, which may concern his profession, his position in the world, etc. Here are the ones that are most commonly used: What does the man owe to God? What does he owe to himself? What does he owe to his fellow men? They are summarized by the love of God, the love of oneself and the love of his fellow men. The preparatory brother enters and tells him that he will soon pass to a new life and he is required to make and sign his will that he will come to take as well as his answers."

Function

Before the ceremony of initiation, the candidate is placed for a time in the Chamber of Reflection, in order to meditate and consider how Freemasonry is about to change his life. He is given a series of questions to answer. Typically, he is asked his duties to God, his fellow men, and himself and in some lodges he is also asked to write a philosophical last will. At the end of this time, he is led to the Lodge room for initiation.

Symbolism

A number of evocative symbols and archetypal images are present in the Chamber of Reflection. They may be physically present or represented on a wall poster, painted or engraved on the walls.

Although the impact of the chamber's furniture must of necessity be personal, the symbolism relates to hermetic and alchemical correspondences. The chamber itself is symbolic of a cave, introducing the candidate to the alchemical element of earth but also represents a womb in which the candidate is developing before going through his symbolic rebirth. The Chamber of reflection represents a lot more depending on the rite.

The human skull or full skeleton

Early Lodges insisted on using a full human skeleton but today most Lodges used a skull and crossbones, it is meant to evokes physical death. In Baroque painting, the still life associated with the presence of a skull was used to illustrate vanity (a defect of a person who thinks too highly of himself). The skull thus acted as a reminder of the fatality of death and as a call to humility. In European and Asian legends, the human skull is a counterpart to the vault of heaven. In the reflection cabinet, it recalls the alchemical theme of putrefaction.

Mirror
In some rites a mirror may be placed on the table of the reflection cabinet, it is meant to signifies the search for self-knowledge as well as introspection but also act as a reminder to the candidate that he is his own judge. In ancient times, the mirror (speculum) was used to observe the sky.

Hourglass
The hourglass symbolizes time. Inducing the sense of the passage of time, the hourglass recalls an essential reality: the limited duration of earthly existence. The hourglass is thus associated with the immutable cycles of birth and death and with the notions of aging, fatality and irreversibility. The two parts of the hourglass can be likened to heaven and earth.

Scythe
Representation of the Reaper as one of the allegories of death.

Agricultural instrument and symbol of Death, sometimes drawn behind the hourglass in the chamber of reflection, the scythe intersects with the parable of the harvest and evokes the grain that dies to give life. In ancient mythology, it is Cronos who is represented holding the scythe and the hourglass. In the Middle Ages, during the ravages of the Black Death, an anthropomorphized representation of death appeared, named "The Grim Reaper". The Grim Reaper was said to kill the sick with a blow from a scythe, regardless of their class. Saturn, the ancient Roman god of agriculture and time, armed with a scythe, takes from one side (time, death, epidemics...) and gives back from the other (harvest, summer, abundance) without distinction. The scythe could therefore include a notion of equality.

Rooster
The rooster is identified with the sun in the mythologies of India and the Native American Pueblo tribes. In Zoroastrian beliefs, it is the symbol of protection of good from evil. Ancient beliefs report that evil spirits, active at night, were driven away by the crowing of the rooster before dawn: "The dawn bird crows all night; and then, it is said, no spirit dares venture out." (Hamlet, Act I, sc.1). The rooster also represents mercury, in the alchemical sense of the term.

Two words are also commonly added to the rooster: "PERSEVERANCE,VIGILANCE" - As the rooster is the only animal, brave enough to step into the dark and call for the day to come, it is a message of encouragement to the candidate.

Bread

Associated with wheat, bread evokes life and combined with leaven it symbolizes the spiritual transformation of the recipient. It can also be associated with sorrow and work, as evoked in the Book of Genesis (III-19): "By the sweat of your brow you shall eat bread until you return to the ground, for from it you were taken." This passage can be linked to the first phase of initiation, the symbolic death, the return to the ground. Bread also includes the four basic elements of alchemy: earth (flour and oven), water (liquid), air (fermentation of leaven) and fire (cooking).

Water

Water is the element without which life is not possible, and is the symbol of all sources of life for the Egyptians. Its presence in Greek-Roman mythology is well known: the Styx, a river whose icy waters symbolize the passage from life to death with its disturbing ferryman Caron. In the Judeo-Christian tradition, water symbolizes purification and renewal.

Salt, sulfur, and mercury

On the small table where the neophyte writes his philosophical testament, there are three containers containing the three basic elements of all transmutation (the three prime or Tria Prima): sulfur, salt and mercury. Mercury was for goldsmiths a noble product that allowed them to purify gold and silver by ridding them of all metallic "impurities". In alchemy, salt, sulfur and mercury are the three founding principles of all things.

The Candle
The Chamber of Reflection's candle symbolizes light, knowledge of oneself and things.
In this dark room, the light from the candle will gradually take up more and more space in contrast to the prevailing darkness. It represents the quest for being and the path to oneself.

The Phrases and inscriptions
Multiple phrases are inscribed onto the walls of the Chamber of Reflection, and they have multiple purposes, some of them discourage the profane from joining freemasonry for a dishonest purpose, some of them warn the profane that his journey will be difficult, other phrases tell the profane that he has nothing to fear if he trusts his future brothers and is a good person.

V.I.T.R.I.O.L. or V.I.T.R.I.O.L.U.M. Meaning;("visita interiora terrae, rectificandoque, invenies occultum lapidem", or "visit the interior of the earth, and purifying it, you will find the hidden stone." This is another way of saying " look within yourself for the truth".) This phrase must be present in all chambers of reflection directly facing the candidate.

Other commonly used Phrases are; If curiosity has led you here, go away, If your soul is in dread, go no further, If you care about human distinctions, Get out. We do not know of any (Meaning there is no Titles in the Lodge ex. a Lord is not above a commoner we are all equals as Master Masons), Know thyself, If you lie, you will be exposed, To make better use of your life, think about your incoming death, If you persevere, you will be purified by the elements; you will come out of the abyss of darkness and you will see the light., VA-T’EN (Ancient French phrase meaning Go Away),(Bellow the Rooster) VIGILANCE - PERSEVERANCE.

Usage 

Nowadays, the Chamber of reflection is used in various ways in most masonic rites, all across the world with the exception of North America where its usage is sporadic but gaining popularity.

In the modern French Rite, the place is called "Chambre de réflexions" plural. In the Emulation Lodge of Improvement, the candidate is alone in a room adjacent to the lodge called "Meditation room" or "Room of reflection ". In the Ancient and Accepted Scottish Rite, it is called the Chamber of Reflection or Cabinet of Reflection. In the York Rite it is most of the time called a Chamber of Reflection,. The Brazilian Rite calls it Gabinete de reflexão or cabine de reflexõesa also the Brazilian Rite differs in the way that the candidate, present, in the Chamber of Reflection also receives another piece of paper that he must read. In it are found articles I and II of the Constitution of the jurisdiction, dealing with Freemasonry and its Principles. Moreover, he must also sign a declaration. The Martinique Rite call it cabinet de réflexion. Chamber of Reflection is also used by the Rectified Scottish Rite, Rite opératif de Salomon, Schröder Rite and Primitive Scottish Rite.

Objects composing the chamber of reflection may also differ depending on the Rite and the geographical location.

Some Rites use the chamber of reflection for the first degree only while other use it on all three degrees.

In popular culture

The Magic Flute 
The Chamber of Reflection is described in the famous opera The Magic Flute. To a person acquainted with masonic rituals, the opera The Magic Flute by the Freemason Wolfgang Amadeus Mozart is clearly intelligible and describes a Masonic initiation including the Chamber of Reflection. That opera was first performed at the Theater auf Der Wieden in Vienna on September 30, 1791, and it is in a certain way a re-enactment of a first-degree Initiation with all its alchemical and Masonic allusions. The protagonists, Tamimo and Pamima are left alone in the darkness and required to keep a vow of silence. A scene at a vault, and tests of fire and water follows this.

The Lost Symbol 
In his book The Lost Symbol, Dan Brown describes the Chamber of reflection in details.  "This room is Masonic?" Sato demanded, turning from the skull and staring at Langdon in the darkness. Langdon nodded calmly. "It’s called a Chamber of Reflection. These rooms are designed as cold, austere places in which a Mason can reflect on his own mortality. By meditating on the inevitability of death, a Mason gains a valuable perspective on the fleeting nature of life."

The Lafayette Sword 
In the 2007 masonic graphic novel by Eric Giacometti and Jacques Ravaud, The Lafayette Sword, we can see a candidate being assassinated while in the reflection chamber.

Mac DeMarco Song 
On 1 April 2014, artist Mac DeMarco released his third full length album, "Salad Days." One of the multiple songs was entitled "Chamber of Reflection," and it takes many aspects of the Masonry's Chamber. One of the significant lyrics is when DeMarco wrote, "Spend some time away/Getting ready for the day you're born again," seemingly referring to being "born again" as a Freemason, and to join the fraternity, you have to "spend some time away," referring to the time spent in the Chamber of Reflection.

References

Freemasonry